Anthony Louis Scarmolin (July 30, 1890, Schio – July 13, 1969, Wyckoff, New Jersey) was an Italian-American composer, pianist, and conductor.

Scarmolin was born in Italy and moved to New York City as a boy, graduating from the New York German Conservatory of Music in 1907. He initially trained as a concert pianist, but lost motor control of his hand and abandoned this career path, concentrating instead on composition. He became a United States citizen in 1911 and fought in World War I as a member of the Army. After the end of the war, Scarmolin was a resident of Union City, New Jersey and became the administrator for the concert and band programs at Emerson High School in the Union City School District, a position he held from 1949 until 1959.

Scarmolin wrote over 1,000 pieces, including some 550 pieces for keyboard instruments. He also completed seven operas and composed prolifically in the areas of choral music, orchestral pieces, and chamber music.

References

Helen Benham, "Anthony Louis Scarmolin". Oxford Music Online.

1890 births
1969 deaths
20th-century classical composers
20th-century classical pianists
20th-century American composers
20th-century American pianists
20th-century American male musicians
American classical composers
American classical pianists
American male composers
American male pianists
Male classical pianists
Classical musicians from New Jersey
Classical musicians from New York (state)
Italian emigrants to the United States
People from Schio
People from Union City, New Jersey